In Greek mythology, Protesilaus (Ancient Greek: Πρωτεσίλᾱος Prōtesilāos) was a hero in the Iliad who was venerated at cult sites in Thessaly and Thrace. Protesilaus was the son of Iphiclus, a "lord of many sheep"; as grandson of the eponymous Phylacos, he was the leader of the Phylaceans. Hyginus surmised that he was originally known as Iolaus—not to be confused with Iolaus, the nephew of Heracles—but was referred to as "Protesilaus" after being the first (protos) to leap ashore at Troy, and thus the first to die in the war.

Description 
In the account of Dares the Phrygian, Protesilaus was illustrated as ". . .fair-skinned, and dignified. He was swift, self-confident, even rash."

Mythology
Protesilaus was one of the suitors of Helen. He brought forty black ships with him to Troy, drawing his men from "flowering" Pyrasus, coastal Antron and Pteleus, "deep in grass", in addition to his native Phylace. Protesilaus was the first to land: "the first man who dared to leap ashore when the Greek fleet touched the Troad", Pausanias recalled, quoting the author of the epic called the Cypria.  An oracle had prophesied that the first Greek to walk on the land after stepping off a ship in the Trojan War would be the first to die, and so, after killing four men, he was himself slain by Hector. Alternate sources have him slain by either Aeneas, Euphorbus, Achates, or Cycnus.   After Protesilaus' death, his brother, Podarces, joined the war in his place. The gods had pity on his widow, Laodamia, daughter of Acastus, and brought him up from Hades to see her. She was at first overjoyed, thinking he had returned from Troy, but after the gods returned him to the underworld, she found the loss unbearable.  She had a bronze statue of her late husband constructed, and devoted herself to it. After her worried father had witnessed her behavior, he had it destroyed; however, Laodamia jumped into the fire with it. Another source claims his wife was Polydora, daughter of Meleager.

According to legend, the Nymphs planted elms on the tomb, in the Thracian Chersonese, of "great-hearted Protesilaus" («μεγάθυμου Πρωτεσιλάου»), elms that grew to be the tallest in the known world; but when their topmost branches saw far off the ruins of Troy, they immediately withered, so great still was the bitterness of the hero buried below.  The story is the subject of a poem by Antiphilus of Byzantium (1st century A.D.) in the Palatine Anthology:

Cult of Protesilaus
Only two sanctuaries to Protesilaus are attested. There was a shrine of Protesilaus at Phylace, his home in Thessaly, where his widow was left lacerating her cheeks in mourning him, and games were organised there in his honour, Pindar noted. The tomb of Protesilaus at Elaeus in the Thracian Chersonese is documented in the 5th century BCE, when, during the Persian War, votive treasure deposited at his tomb was plundered by the satrap Artayctes, under permission from Xerxes. The Greeks later captured and executed Artayctes, returning the treasure. The tomb was mentioned again when Alexander the Great arrived at Elaeus on his campaign against the Persian Empire. He offered a sacrifice on the tomb, hoping to avoid the fate of Protesilaus when he arrived in Asia.  Like Protesilaus before him, Alexander was the first to set foot on Asian soil during his campaign. Philostratus writing of this temple in the early 3rd century CE, speaks of a cult statue of Protesilaus at this temple "standing on a base which was shaped like the prow of a boat." Coins of Elaeus from the time of Commodus with Protesilaus on the prow of a ship, in helmet, cuirass and short chiton on the reverse probably depict this statue. Strabo also mentions the sanctuary.
 
A founder-cult of Protesilaus at Scione, in Pallene, Chalcidice, was given an etiology by the Greek grammarian and mythographer of the Augustan-era Conon that is at variance with the epic tradition. In this, Conon asserts that Protesilaus survived the Trojan War and was returning with Priam's sister Aethilla as his captive. When the ships put ashore for water on the coast of Pallene, between Scione and Mende, Aethilla persuaded the other Trojan women to burn the ships, forcing Protesilaus to remain and found the city of Scione. A rare tetradrachm of Scione ca. 480 BCE acquired by the British Museum depicts Protesilaus, identified by the retrograde legend PROTESLAS.

Protesilaus, speaking from beyond the grave, is the oracular source of the corrected eye-witness version of the actions of heroes at Troy, related by a "vine-dresser" to a Phoenician merchant in the framing device that gives an air of authenticity to the narratives of Philostratus' Heroicus, a late literary representation of Greek hero-cult traditions that developed independently of the epic tradition.

Cultural depictions
Among very few representations of Protesilaus, a sculpture by Deinomenes is just a passing mention in Pliny's Natural History; the outstanding surviving examples are two Roman copies of a lost mid-fifth century Greek bronze original represent Protesilaus at his defining moment, one of them in a torso the British Museum, the other at the Metropolitan Museum of Art. The Metropolitan's sculpture of a heroically nude helmeted warrior stands on a forward-slanting base, looking down and slightly to his left, with his right arm raised, prepared to strike, would not be identifiable, save by comparison made by Gisela Richter with a torso of the same model and its associated slanting base, schematically carved as the prow of a ship encircled by waves: Protesilaus about to jump ashore.

If Euripides' tragedy, Protesilaos, had survived, his name would be more familiar today.

The poem in the Palatine Anthology (VII.141) on Protesilaus by Antiphilus of Byzantium in turn inspired F. L. Lucas's poem "The Elms of Protesilaus" (1927).

Works employing this myth
 "Dialogues of the Dead", by Lucian,
 Protesilaos, a lost tragedy of Euripides of which only fragments survive 
 "Protesilaodamia", a lost work of Laevius
 "carmen 61", "carmen 68", by Catullus
 "Elegies, to Cynthia", by Propertius
 "Heroicus", by Philostratus
 "The Epistles", 13, by Ovid
 "Laodamia", by William Wordsworth
 " Veeraanganaa", by Michael Madhusudan Dutt
 "Protesilas i Laodamia", by Stanisław Wyspiański
 ΠΡΩΤΕΣΙΛΑΟΣ, Η ΤΡΑΓΩΔΙΑ, ΤΟΥ Κωνσταντίνου Αθ. Οικονόμου, Λάρισα, 2010. [www.scribd.com/oikonomoukon]

References

External links

 "Laodamia," poem  by William Wordsworth.
 "Laodamia to Protesilaus," poem by Jared Carter.

Achaean Leaders
Greek mythological heroes
Characters in Greek mythology
Thessalians in the Trojan War